is a Japanese web manga series written and illustrated by Makoto Akui. It has been serialized on Shogakukan's online platforms MangaONE and Ura Sunday since April 2017.

An anime television series adaptation by Nippon Animation is set to premiere in April 2023.

As of December 2021, Ao no Orchestra had over 3.3 million copies in circulation. In 2023, the manga won the 68th Shogakukan Manga Award for the shōnen category.

Plot
Hajime Aono, a boy who used to win many prizes in violin competitions, stopped playing the violin due to family circumstances. After that, he joins the orchestra club at high school, where he meet Nao Saeki, who has achieved the top score in the competition, and compete for violin skills.

Characters

Hajime's violin performances are performed by Ryota Higashi.

Ritsuko's violin performances are performed by Yurie Yamada.

Nao's violin performances are performed by Takuto Owari.

Haru's violin performances are performed by Kyoko Ogawa.

Ichirō's violin performances are performed by Harumi Sato.

Shizuka's violin performances are performed by Karen Kido.

Yō's violin performances are performed by Tomotaka Seki.

Sō's violin performances are performed by María Dueñas.

Ryūjin's violin performances are performed by Hilary Hahn.

Media

Manga
Written and illustrated by Makoto Akui, Ao no Orchestra started on Shogakukan's online platform MangaONE on April 25, 2017; it also started on Ura Sunday a week later on May 2. Shogakukan has collected its chapters into individual tankōbon volumes. The first volume was released on July 19, 2017. As of April 19, 2022, ten volumes have been released.

Volume list

Anime
In April 2022, it was announced that the series will receive an anime television series adaptation. The series is produced by Nippon Animation and directed by Seiji Kishi, with scripts written by Yūko Kakihara, character designs handled by Kazuaki Morita and violinist performances for the character Hajime Aono by Ryota Higashi. It is set to premiere on April 9, 2023, on NHK Educational TV. The opening theme song is "Cantabile" performed by Novelbright, while the ending theme song is  performed by Yuika.

Other media
A promotional video featuring Star Wars musical theme "The Imperial March", composed by John Williams, and including illustrations from the manga, was uploaded by Deutsche Grammophon's YouTube channel on May 4, 2022, to celebrate Star Wars Day and Williams' 90th birthday.

Reception
As of December 2021, the manga had over 3.3 million copies in circulation. In 2023, Ao no Orchestra won the 68th Shogakukan Manga Award in the shōnen category, along with Call of the Night.

References

External links
  
  
 

2023 anime television series debuts
Anime series based on manga
Coming-of-age anime and manga
Drama anime and manga
Japanese webcomics
Music in anime and manga
NHK original programming
Nippon Animation
Shōnen manga
Shogakukan manga
Upcoming anime television series
Webcomics in print
Works about violins and violinists
Winners of the Shogakukan Manga Award for shōnen manga